"Certified Gangstas" is a song by American hip hop recording artist Jim Jones, released as his solo debut single as well as the lead single from his debut solo studio album On My Way to Church. The song features vocals from Jay Bezel and Jones’ fellow Dipset cohort Cam'ron. The song reached number 80 on the Hot R&B/Hip-Hop Songs in the United States. Jones has said the song is an ode to West Coast hip hop legend Eazy-E's 1987 single, "Boyz-n-the-Hood", which the song samples.

Music video
The music video for the song was released in 2004. It was directed by Jones and includes a cameo appearance by Eazy-E’s son Lil Eazy-E. The video parodies the opening scene of the 1993 film, Menace II Society, where O-Dog is confronted by the Asian owners of a convenience store.

Remix
The song was remixed removing Jay Bezel and replacing him with a verse from The Game and Lil Flip. The remix was used for the music video.

Sequel
A sequel to "Certified Gangstas" was released in January 2010 entitled "Certified Gangstas Pt. 2". It features Game, Mel Matrix (of Diplomat) and Sen City.

Chart positions

Release history

References

Jim Jones (rapper) songs
2004 debut singles
Cam'ron songs
Songs written by Jim Jones (rapper)
2004 songs
MNRK Music Group singles
Songs written by Cam'ron